Leonidas Kamende (born 28 August 1979) was a Kenyan female volleyball player.

She competed with the Kenya women's national volleyball team at the 2004 Summer Olympics in Athens, Greece. She participated in the 2002 FIVB Volleyball Women's World Championship. She played with Kenya Pipeline.

Clubs
  Kenya Pipelines

References

External links
 
http://allafrica.com/stories/200209120202.html
http://www.bestsports.com.br/db/atlpag.php?atl=17562&lang=2
http://www.panapress.com/Kenya-picks-African-Games-volleyball-squad--13-491818-17-lang1-index.html
http://www.gettyimages.com/event/olympics-day-7-volleyball-51086723#italy-plays-kenya-during-the-womens-indoor-volleyball-preliminary-on-picture-id51215583

1979 births
Living people
Kenyan women's volleyball players
Place of birth missing (living people)
Volleyball players at the 2004 Summer Olympics
Olympic volleyball players of Kenya